Stephen Adebisi Gbadegesin Adegbite (born 23 May 1972) is a Nigerian hurdler. He competed in the men's 110 metres hurdles at the 1996 Summer Olympics.

References

External links
 

1972 births
Living people
Athletes (track and field) at the 1996 Summer Olympics
Nigerian male hurdlers
Olympic athletes of Nigeria
Place of birth missing (living people)